Shourabh Kharwar (born 6 February 1993) is an Indian cricketer. He made his List A debut for Chhattisgarh in the 2016–17 Vijay Hazare Trophy on 26 February 2017. He made his first-class debut for Chhattisgarh in the 2017–18 Ranji Trophy on 1 November 2017. He made his Twenty20 debut on 12 January 2021, for Chhattisgarh in the 2020–21 Syed Mushtaq Ali Trophy.

References

External links
 

1993 births
Living people
Indian cricketers
Chhattisgarh cricketers
Place of birth missing (living people)